The Louisville Catbirds were a basketball team of the CBA who played in the mid 1980s.

History
The Catbirds played two seasons in 1983–85 in Kentucky before moving to La Crosse, Wisconsin, in which the team would reach the CBA finals three times, winning twice (1990 and 1992). Head coach Flip Saunders led to the defeating Eric Musselman's Rapid City Thrillers team both times. Vincent Hamilton, Andre Turner, Tony White, Dwayne McClain, Carlos Clark, and Bill Martin helped the Catbirds achieve their franchise's first title in 1990. Two years later, Vincent Hamilton, David Rivers, Mark Davis, Kenny Battle, Derrick Gervin, and Brian Rahilly took La Crosse to a second championship. The team defected following the 1993–94 season.

Team profile

Statistics

Notable players

One of the notable Catbird players was Tom Payne, the first African-American basketball player at the University of Kentucky. A New York Times article told a story of this player: "Tom Payne, a 7-foot-1-inch former professional basketball player who spent 11 years in a Kentucky prison after a rape conviction, is scheduled to make his boxing debut at Los Angeles on June 14 in a four-round bout against Nick DeLong of Long Beach, Calif. After his parole late last year, he played with the Louisville Catbirds of the Continental Basketball Association.

Another Louisville Catbirds player was Wiley Brown, a player (and later assistant coach) at the University of Louisville who played tight end for the Philadelphia Eagles for two seasons.

Former University of Kentucky player Dirk Minniefield played for the Louisville Catbirds after being cut by the NBA's New Jersey Nets.

See also
 Sports in Louisville, Kentucky

References

Sources
 
 
 

 
Continental Basketball Association teams
Defunct basketball teams in Kentucky
Sports clubs disestablished in 1985
Basketball teams established in 1983
1983 establishments in Kentucky
1985 disestablishments in Kentucky
Basketball teams in Kentucky

es:Pittsburgh Piranhas
it:Pittsburgh Piranhas